Wang Zhao (1917–1970) was a Chinese political figure active during the early People's Republic.  Wang was born in Tianjing Village, Pingshan County, Hebei Province. He joined the Communist Party of China (CPC) in 1932. He became the secretary of the CPC Shijiazhuang municipal committee and mayor of that city in August 1945. He attended the first CPPCC meeting in September 1949, as a delegate from the Chinese People's Liberation Army, and attended the founding ceremony of the People's Republic of China on October 1. He joined the People's Volunteer Army in October 1950, and fought in the Korean War. He was awarded the first-class national flag medal and second-class independence freedom medal in North Korea. In the Spring of 1961, he was appointed the second secretary of the CPC Qinghai committee and the governor of Qinghai. During the Cultural Revolution, he was persecuted by the Gang of Four and died on February 12, 1970. He was politically rehabilitated in 1979.

1917 births
1970 deaths
People's Republic of China politicians from Hebei
Political office-holders in Hebei
Politicians from Shijiazhuang
Victims of the Cultural Revolution
Political office-holders in Qinghai
Mayors of places in China
Chinese Communist Party politicians from Hebei